Charles Hoyt may refer to:
Charles B. Hoyt (c. 1896–1978), American track athlete and coach
Charles H. Hoyt (1859–1900), American dramatist
Charles M. Hoyt (1827–1871), American politician